Franziska Weisz (also credited as Franziska Weiss or Weiß; born 4 May 1980 in Vienna) is an Austrian actress. She starred in the film Hotel, which was screened in the Un Certain Regard section at the 2004 Cannes Film Festival.

Filmography

Cinema 
  (2016)
 The Lies You Sleep With (2014)
 Stations of the Cross (2014)
 Habermann (2010)
 The Robber (2010)
 Die Diebe (2005)
 Zum Beispiel Praterstern (2005)
 Hotel (2004)
  (2004)
 Hundstage (2001)
 The Piano Teacher (2000)

Television 
 The Swarm (2023)
 SOKO Kitzbühel (2005)
 Mein Mörder (2004)
 4 Frauen und ein Todesfall (2004)
 Tatort – Der Wächter der Quelle (2003)
 In Liebe vereint (2003)
 Julia – Eine ungewöhnliche Frau (2002)

Theatre 
 Sommerspiele Perchtoldsdorf (2005)

References

External links 

 Official Website 
 

1980 births
Living people
Austrian film actresses
Actresses from Vienna
University of Vienna alumni
Alumni of De Montfort University
Alumni of King's College London
Austrian stage actresses
Austrian television actresses
21st-century Austrian actresses